The Langley Thunder are a Senior A box lacrosse team, based in Langley, British Columbia, Canada.  The team competes in the 7-team Western Lacrosse Association (WLA), playing their home games at the 5,276 capacity Langley Events Centre.

The Thunder won back-to-back WLA Championships in the 2011 and 2012 seasons.  Notable Thunder players include Athan Iannucci, Alex Turner, and Matt Leveque.

The Langley Thunder hosted the Mann Cup  in September 2011 at the Langley Events Centre where they played the Brampton Excelsiors, losing the series 4-1 to the visitors.

The Langley Junior Thunder of the BC Junior A Lacrosse League and the Langley Intermediate Thunder also play at the LEC, operating under the same management as the WLA Thunder.

All-time record

History
The Thunder has undergone multiple name changes and transfer since their origination in 1994.  Beginning in 2004, the team has been known as the Langley Thunder:
 1994-1999 North Shore Indians (transferred to Kelowna)
 2000-2001 Okanagan Thunder (transferred to North Vancouver)
 2002-2003 North Shore Thunder (transferred to Langley)
 2004–present Langley Thunder

Gallery

References

Langley, British Columbia (district municipality)
Western Lacrosse Association teams
1994 establishments in British Columbia
Sports clubs established in 1994